The Our Lady of the Angels Pastoral Region is a pastoral region of the Archdiocese of Los Angeles in the Roman Catholic Church.  It covers downtown and central Los Angeles (USA) west to Malibu and south to Los Angeles Airport. The current regional auxiliary bishop is Bishop Edward W. Clark. The region has 76 parishes, ten high schools, many elementary schools and five hospitals.

Parishes

Deanery 13 (Westside)

Deanery 14 (Hollywood/Mid-City/Silverlake)

Deanery 15 (Downtown/South)

Deanery 16 (South LA/Inglewood)

Spanish Mission
''Note: This is not a Spanish Mission, but rather, a parish church.

Universities and Colleges

High schools

Daniel Murphy High School, located at 241 S. Detroit St., Los Angeles, closed in 2008.

Elementary schools
Parish-affiliated elementary schools are noted above in the charts listing parishes. There are several non-affiliated elementary or middle schools in the region.
Cathedral Chapel, 755 S. Cochran Ave., Los Angeles   
Immaculate Heart Middle School, 5515 Franklin Ave., Los Angeles 
Notre Dame Academy Elementary, 2911 Overland Ave., Los Angeles 
St. Turibius, 1524 Essex St., Los Angeles

Hospitals
St. John's Health Center, 1328 Twenty-Second Street, Santa Monica
 St. Vincent Medical Center

Cemeteries
Crypt Mausoleum of the Cathedral of Our Lady of the Angels, Los Angeles
Holy Cross Cemetery, Culver City

See also
San Fernando Pastoral Region
San Gabriel Pastoral Region
San Pedro Pastoral Region
Santa Barbara Pastoral Region
List of schools in the Roman Catholic Archdiocese of Los Angeles

External links
Roman Catholic Archdiocese of Los Angeles

Roman Catholic Archdiocese of Los Angeles
Los Angeles Our Lady